
Gmina Pawłosiów is a rural gmina (administrative district) in Jarosław County, Subcarpathian Voivodeship, in south-eastern Poland.

Villages
Gmina Pawłosiów contains the villages and settlements of Cieszacin Mały, Cieszacin Wielki, Kidałowice, Maleniska, Ożańsk, Pawłosiów, Szczytna, Tywonia, Widna Góra and Wierzbna.

Neighbouring gminas
Gmina Pawłosiów is bordered by the town of Jarosław and by the gminas of Chłopice, Jarosław, Przeworsk, Roźwienica and Zarzecze.

References

Polish official population figures 2006

Pawlosiow
Jarosław County